"Can't Get Enough" is a song written by Kent Blazy, Will Rambeaux and Blair Daly, and recorded by American country music artist Patty Loveless.  It was released in January 1999 as the first single from her compilation album Classics.

The song charted for 20 weeks on the Billboard Hot Country Singles and Tracks chart, reaching number 21 during the week of April 17, 1999. "Can't Get Enough" became Loveless' first entry into the Billboard Hot 100, charting for four weeks, reaching number 96 during the week of April 17, 1999.

Chart positions

Year-end charts

References

1999 singles
Patty Loveless songs
Songs written by Kent Blazy
Songs written by Blair Daly
Song recordings produced by Emory Gordy Jr.
Epic Records singles
1999 songs
Songs written by Will Rambeaux